James Jeter, also known and credited as James Jeeter, (September 15, 1921 – March 4, 2007) was an American film, stage and television actor. He was known for playing the recurring role of blacksmith Hans Dorfler in the American historical drama television series Little House on the Prairie.

Life and career 
Jeter was born in Star, Texas. He began his career on stage, performing at the Alley Theatre. Jeter made his film debut with an uncredited appearance in the 1964 film The Best Man. He next appeared in the film Kiss Me, Stupid.

Jeter appeared in the 1966 film The Sand Pebbles, in the role of Boatswain's Mate 2nd Class Farren, He then appeared in the 1967 film Cool Hand Luke. 

Jeter guest-starred in television programs including Gunsmoke, Bonanza, Death Valley Days, The Waltons, The Mary Tyler Moore Show, Rawhide, The Rockford Files, Knots Landing, M*A*S*H, Land of the Giants and The Wild Wild West. He also played the recurring role of "Smitty" in the drama television series Delvecchio and as the blacksmith Hans Dorfler in Little House on the Prairie from 1974 to 1980.

Jeter appeared in films such as F.I.S.T., The Border, Assault on Precinct 13, Hang 'Em High, Fun with Dick and Jane, The Four Deuces, Ice Station Zebra, A Change of Seasons, The Hollywood Knights, Blow Out, The Christian Licorice Store and Fast Break. In 1985 Jeter played the lead role at the Geva Theatre Center in the play All My Sons, replacing Gerald Richards, who had been hospitalised. His final credit was for the 1993 film A Perfect World. Jeter worked as a lawyer in California.

Death 
Jeter died in March 2007 in Houston, Texas, at the age of 85.

Filmography

References

External links 

Rotten Tomatoes profile

1921 births
2007 deaths
People from Texas
Male actors from Texas
American male film actors
American male stage actors
American male television actors
20th-century American male actors
California lawyers
20th-century American lawyers